is a railway station on the Kintetsu Namba Line in Nippombashi Itchome, Chūō-ku, Osaka, Japan.  Trains of the Nara Line arrive at and depart from the station.

Lines
Namba Line
Osaka Metro (Nippombashi Station)
Sakaisuji Line (K17)
Sennichimae Line (S17)

Layout
This station has 2 side platforms serving a track each on the third basement. Two ticket gates on the second basement are opened from the first train until the last train. There is a ticket gate called "Niji Gate" on the first basement, connecting to Namba Walk. Entrances are located on the first basement near ticket gates of Nippombashi Station operated by Osaka Metro.

No limited express trains stop at this station.

Surroundings

Stations next to Kintetsu Nippombashi

References

Chūō-ku, Osaka
Railway stations in Japan opened in 1970
Railway stations in Osaka